Jesus Villafañe Marquina (born 19 November 1986) is a Venezuelan beach volleyball player. He played with Igor Hernández at the 2012 Summer Olympics. He was born in Barinas, Venezuela.

References

1986 births
Living people
Venezuelan beach volleyball players
Men's beach volleyball players
Beach volleyball players at the 2012 Summer Olympics
Olympic beach volleyball players of Venezuela
Beach volleyball players at the 2015 Pan American Games
Pan American Games competitors for Venezuela
People from Barinas (state)
20th-century Venezuelan people
21st-century Venezuelan people